Fairfield is an unincorporated community located within Howell Township in Monmouth County, New Jersey, United States. The community is centered on the intersection of County Route 524 (CR 524) and Ketchum Road, where the Colonial Era Our House Tavern is located. The area includes several small businesses, township offices and schools. There are also small farms and residential developments in the area.
Fairfield was a stop on the Freehold and Jamesburg Agricultural Railroad.

References

Neighborhoods in Howell Township, New Jersey
Unincorporated communities in Monmouth County, New Jersey
Unincorporated communities in New Jersey